Stenoglene roseus is a moth in the family Eupterotidae. It was described by Druce in 1886. It is found in Burundi, the Democratic Republic of Congo (Katanga, East Kasai, Bas Congo), Ivory Coast, Kenya, Malawi, Mozambique, Nigeria and Uganda.

Description
The wingspan is about 54 mm. Both wings are pale golden ochreous, the forewings with a broadish postmedian, concave, rusty transverse band, broadening as it approaches the inner margin near the tornus. The hindwings are immaculate.

References

Moths described in 1886
Janinae
Moths of Sub-Saharan Africa